Ciba or CIBA may refer to:

CIBA 
 Chemical Industry Basel (CIBA), former name of a company (Ciba-Geigy) that merged with "Sandoz" to form Novartis
 Ciba Specialty Chemicals
 Ciba Vision
 CIBA, acronym for the California Intercollegiate Baseball Association
 CIBA, acronym for the Connecticut International Baccalaureate Academy
 Confédération International de Billard Artistique of Artistic billiards
 Central Institute of Brackishwater Aquaculture

Other uses 
 Ciba cake, cooked glutinous rice pounded into paste – a traditional Chinese food
 Ciba, a village in Crăciunești Commune, Mureș County, Romania
 Ciba, a village in Miercurea-Ciuc city, Harghita County, Romania
 Cíbà, Chinese name for dictionary software called PowerWord
 Ciba, a genus of Caribbean spiders

See also 
 Csiba (disambiguation)